P. vulgaris  may refer to:
 Paikiniana vulgaris, a spider species in the genus Paikiniana and the family Linyphiidae
 Phaseolus vulgaris, an herbaceous annual plant species
 Pinguicula vulgaris, a perennial insectivorous plant species
 Primula vulgaris, a garden plant species
 Proteus vulgaris, a rod-shaped Gram negative bacterium species
 Prunella vulgaris, a wild flower species
 Pulsatilla vulgaris, a buttercup species

See also
 Vulgaris (disambiguation)